Pedro Cordero may refer to:
Pedro Cordero (footballer) (born 1968), Spanish football director and former footballer
Pedro Cordero (boccia) (born 1972), Spanish boccia player

See also
Pedro Cordeiro (disambiguation)